
Gmina Stare Bogaczowice is a rural gmina (administrative district) in Wałbrzych County, Lower Silesian Voivodeship, in south-western Poland.

Neighbouring gminas
Gmina Stare Bogaczowice is bordered by the towns of Boguszów-Gorce, Świebodzice, Szczawno-Zdrój and Wałbrzych, and the gminas of Bolków, Czarny Bór, Dobromierz and Marciszów.

Villages
The gmina contains the villages of Chwaliszów, Cieszów, Cisów, Gostków, Jabłów, Lubomin, Nowe Bogaczowice, Podgórna, Stare Bogaczowice, Struga and Wrony.

References

Stare Bogaczowice
Wałbrzych County